TD Bank Ballpark is a 6,100-seat baseball park in Bridgewater, New Jersey, that is the home of the Somerset Patriots, a Double-A level Minor League Baseball team in the Eastern League. The ballpark hosts 70 Patriots games as well as Patriots playoff games and other high school and corporate events each year. 

TD Bank Ballpark is named for TD Bank, N.A., which purchased Commerce Bancorp in 2009. Formerly called Commerce Bank Ballpark, the original naming rights were sold to the institution in July 2000. The ballpark was originally known as Somerset Ballpark.  Its first regular season baseball game was held on June 7, 1999. Since its opening, more than six million fans have attended games at the stadium.

History
Construction on the ballpark commenced on April 28, 1998 with Epic Construction as the general contractor.

TD Bank Ballpark was opened by then–New Jersey governor Christine Todd Whitman and other New Jersey officials on June 7, 1999.

TD Bank Ballpark is the home of the Somerset County Baseball Tournament and was the home of the Big East Conference baseball tournament from 2000-2005. In the off-season, the ballpark has been the site of the Big Apple Circus, most recently in 2016, and other big events. In 2002 and 2003, TD Bank Ballpark was home to the New Jersey Pride of Major League Lacrosse. In 2004, the New Jersey Fire of Pro Cricket played their only season of existence at TD Bank Ballpark.

In 2000, TD Bank Ballpark hosted the Atlantic League All-Star Game, with a crowd of 7,035. The venue also hosted the 2008 Atlantic League All-Star Game on July 16, breaking both the All-Star Game and ballpark attendance records with 8,290 fans.

In 2007 and 2015, the Atlantic League of Professional Baseball granted TD Bank Ballpark the Atlantic League Ballpark of the Year award.

For two consecutive years in 2015 and 2016, TD Bank Ballpark was named Ballpark Digest’s Best Independent Minor League Ballpark in the nation.

The 2017 Atlantic League All-Star Game was held at TD Bank Ballpark on July 12. It was the 20th playing of the All-Star Game with the Freedom Division All-Stars topping the Liberty Division All-Stars by a score of 10–3 in front 8,175 fans. This was the third time that the ballpark hosted the Atlantic League All-Star Game.

In September 2021, the ballpark was flooded after heavy rains from Tropical Storm Ida. TD Bank Ballpark also flooded in 1999 during Hurricane Floyd.

Ballpark features
TD Bank Ballpark was designed by architectural firms Clarke Caton Hintz and SSP Architectural Group. The ballpark's wine-colored brick and green exposed steel facade and metal roof is designed to evoke the historic character and elements reminiscent of some of the country's older stadiums. The ballpark was honored for its outstanding design with a New Jersey Golden Trowel Grand Design Award.

TD Bank Ballpark includes 6,100 fixed seats and additional lawn seating, by the Patriots' bullpen. Additional options include a series of hospitality suites, the Diamond Club, for company meetings and special catering services, the Party Deck for company outings or other special occasions, and the Ballpark BBQ picnic area that can accommodate a group of 30 to 350 fans. There is also a children's Fun Zone near the lawn seating. Parking is $5.

Concessions at TD Bank Ballpark include traditional ballpark fare, health food and gluten-free options. The official hospitality provider is HomePlate Catering & Hospitality. The Patriots Team Store, located at the main gate, is the Somerset Patriots' official merchandise and souvenir store.

TD Bank Ballpark features 3,465 solar panels. The solar panels are expected to produce 1,140,000 kWh annually and supplement 88% of the consumption used at the ballpark. They are located in the ballpark's Red and White parking lots.

Robert Wood Johnson University Hospital has a  physical therapy and sports medicine center at TD Bank Ballpark that also serves as the official health care provider of the Somerset Patriots.

In October 2020, a sculpture of Manager Emeritus Sparky Lyle and Chairman Emeritus Steve Kalafer was unveiled in a newly renovated area in front of TD Bank Ballpark and recreates an early picture of a conversation between Kalafer and Lyle. The sculpture was created by world-renowned sculptor Brian Hanlon of Toms River, New Jersey.

Concerts
TD Bank Ballpark has hosted four major concerts, including traditional pop and jazz musician Tony Bennett, country music artist Willie Nelson, pop music star Jessica Simpson, and a 50's festival including The Teenagers, The Duprees, Jerry Lee Lewis, and Chuck Berry.

Accessibility and transportation
TD Bank Ballpark is accessible by mass transit via the Bridgewater station on the NJ Transit Raritan Valley Line. The station is located just beyond the center field wall and was reconstructed in 1999 in conjunction with the construction of TD Bank Ballpark, and the ballpark's White Lot is used for commuter parking.

The ballpark is accessible by car via I-287 and U.S. Route 22 with connections to I-78, New Jersey Turnpike (I-95), Garden State Parkway and other highways and roads. Parking is available in three on site lots, labeled red, white and blue, where covered parking spaces are provided by the elevated solar panel arrays.

See also
TD Garden (Boston, Massachusetts)
TD Bank Sports Center (Hamden, Connecticut)
TD Ameritrade Park Omaha (Nebraska)
TD Arena (Charleston, South Carolina)

References

External links
  About TD Bank Ball Park
 Ballpark Reviews - TD Bank Ballpark
 Minor League Parks - TD Bank Ballpark
 

Somerset Patriots
Minor league baseball venues
Sports venues in New Jersey
Baseball venues in New Jersey
Soccer venues in New Jersey
Women's Professional Soccer stadiums
NJ/NY Gotham FC
Cricket grounds in the United States
Former Major League Lacrosse venues
Buildings and structures in Somerset County, New Jersey
Tourist attractions in Somerset County, New Jersey
Sports venues in the New York metropolitan area
Sports in Somerset County, New Jersey
Cricket in New Jersey
1999 establishments in New Jersey
Sports venues completed in 1999
Lacrosse venues in the United States
Eastern League (1938–present) ballparks